The Rahrovan minaret (Raran minaret, or Rarun) is located 6 km northeast of Isfahan in Raran, Iran. The minaret is 30 m high. It dates back to the Seljuq era and has almost kept its original shape, but its inscriptions has been damaged severely. It is the fourth oldest minaret in Isfahan province after Ali minaret, Sarban minaret and Ziyar minaret. Its decorations are simple, featuring a stripe of rhombic shapes around the minaret, in which the names of Mohammad and Ali are repeated. On the top of the minaret, there is a window for muezzin and signal fire for orientation of caravans and passengers in the desert.

See also 
 List of the historical structures in the Isfahan province

References 

Minarets in Iran
Mosques in Isfahan